A meddler is a busybody or marplot.

Meddler can also refer to:

 "Meddler" (short story), a science fiction short story by Philip K. Dick
 Meddler (horse), a thoroughbred racehorse from the early 1900s
 Meddler Island, included in the List of Torres Strait Islands
 "Meddler", a song by August Burns Red from the album Constellations

See also
 Medlar (Mespilus germanica), a large shrub and its edible fruit